Roberto Cammarelle (born 22 March 1980) is an Italian amateur boxer, best known for winning the World Amateur Boxing Championships in 2007 (Chicago) and 2009 (Milan) as a super heavyweight and a gold medal at the 2008 Olympic Games in Beijing. He won a silver medal in 2012 London Olympic Games, losing to Anthony Joshua.

Biography
Roberto Cammarelle was born in Cinisello Balsamo (Milan), from Lucanian parents, his father Angelo Cammarelle is from Rionero in Vulture and his mother Giovanna Caraffa from Filiano. He is a member of the Italian State Police.

Amateur medals
He also won a Super Heavyweight bronze medal at the 2004 Summer Olympics and a silver medal at the 2004 European Amateur Boxing Championships in Pula, Croatia. 
The southpaw also won the bronze medal at the 2005 World Amateur Boxing Championships in Mianyang.
He is 190 cm tall and weighs 103 kg.

Amateur highlights 
Italian Heavyweight Champion 2000/2001, Italian Super Heavyweight Champion 2002-2007
1998 competed as a Heavyweight at the Junior World Championships in Buenos Aires, Argentina
Lost to Steffen Kretschmann (Germany) PTS (4-12)
2002 2nd place at the European Championships in Perm, Russia as a Superheavyweight
Defeated Peter Yatsura (Slovakia) PTS
Defeated Gaga Bolkvadze (Georgia) PTS
Defeated Artyom Tsarikov (Ukraine) PTS
Lost to Alexander Povetkin (Russia) PTS
2002 2nd place at the Military World Championships in Curragh, Ireland
Lost to Sebastian Köber (Germany) PTS (7-16)
2004 2nd place at the European Championships in Pula, Croatia
Defeated Sebastian Köber (Germany) RSC
Defeated Csaba Kurtuzs (Hungary) RSCO
Defeated David Price (Great Britain) PTS
Defeated Sergey Rozhnov (Bulgaria) PTS
Lost to Alexander Povetkin (Russia) PTS
2004 won the Military World Championships in Fort Huachcua, United States
2004 3rd place at the Athens Olympics.
Defeated Gbenga Oloukun (Nigeria) PTS (29-13)
Defeated Alexey Mazikin (Ukraine) PTS (23-21)
Lost to Alexander Povetkin (Russia) PTS (18-31)
2005 3rd place at the World Championships in Mianyang, China
Defeated Ivica Bacurin (Croatia) RSCO
Defeated Aliaksandr Apanasionak (Belarus) RSCO
Defeated Michael Wilson (United States) RSCO-1
Lost to Roman Romanchuk (Russia) PTS (27-34)
2006 competed at the European Championships in Plovdiv, Bulgaria
Defeated Modo Sallah (Sweden) DSQ-3
Lost to Islam Timurziev (Russia) PTS (21-36)
2007 won the World Championships in Chicago, USA
Defeated Nelson Hysa (Albania) PTS (20-2)
Defeated José Payares (Venezuela) PTS (27-4)
Defeated Kubrat Pulev (Bulgaria) PTS (12-5)
Defeated David Price (Great Britain) walk-over
Defeated Islam Timurziev (Russia) walk-over
Defeated Vyacheslav Glazkov (Ukraine) PTS (24-14)
2008 Beijing Olympics
Defeated Marko Tomasović (Croatia) PTS (13-1)
Defeated Oscar Rivas (Colombia) PTS (9-5)
Defeated David Price (Great Britain) RSC-2
Defeated Zhang Zhilei (China) RSC-4
2009 won the World Championships in Milan, Italy
Defeated Roman Kapitonenko (Ukraine) PTS (10:5)
Defeated Viktar Zuyeu (Belarus) RET (1:0)
Defeated Kubrat Pulev (Bulgaria) PTS (12:6)
Defeated Rok Urbanc (Slovenia) PTS (14:0)
Defeated Michael Hunter (USA) PTS (8:1)
2010 competed at the European Championships in Moscow, Russia
Defeated Marcin Rekowski (Poland) 12-2
Lost to Sergey Kuzmin (Russia) PTS (3-6)
2011 2nd place at the European Championships in Ankara, Turkey
Defeated Viktor Zuyev (Belarus) RSCH 2
Defeated Tony Yoka (France) 22-9
Defeated Istvan Bernath (Hungary) 18-6
Defeated Mihai Nistor (Romania) RET 2
Lost to Magomed Omarov (Russia) 14-20
2011 Competed at the World Championships in Baku, Azerbaijan
Defeated Jose Payares (Venezuela) 17-8
Defeated Con Sheehan (Ireland) RET 3
Lost to Anthony Joshua (Great Britain) 13-15
2012 London Olympics
Defeated Ytalo Perea Castillo (Ecuador)
Defeated Mohammed Arjaoui (Morocco)
Defeated Magomedrasul Medzhidov (Azerbaijan)
Lost to Anthony Joshua (Great Britain) (UK)
2013 3rd place at the World Championships in Almaty, Kazakhstan
Defeated Tony Yoka (France) 3-0
Defeated Modo Sallah (Sweden) 3-0
Defeated Filip Hrgovic (Croatia) 3-0
Lost to Magomedrasul Medzhidov (Azerbaijan) 0-3

References

External links
 Roberto Cammarelle Amateur Career (in Spanish) compiled by Pedro Cabrera Isidrón of the Cuban Olympics Committee
 

Boxers at the 2004 Summer Olympics
Boxers at the 2008 Summer Olympics
Boxers at the 2012 Summer Olympics
Olympic boxers of Italy
Olympic gold medalists for Italy
Olympic bronze medalists for Italy
1980 births
People of Lucanian descent
Living people
Super-heavyweight boxers
Olympic medalists in boxing
Olympic silver medalists for Italy
Medalists at the 2012 Summer Olympics
Medalists at the 2008 Summer Olympics
Medalists at the 2004 Summer Olympics
Italian male boxers
AIBA World Boxing Championships medalists
Mediterranean Games gold medalists for Italy
Competitors at the 2005 Mediterranean Games
Competitors at the 2009 Mediterranean Games
Competitors at the 2013 Mediterranean Games
Mediterranean Games medalists in boxing
Boxers of Fiamme Oro